Amphibola crenata (tītiko in the Māori language or mud-flat snail in English) is a species of air-breathing snail with an operculum, a pulmonate gastropod mollusc which lives in a habitat that is intermediate between the land and the sea, not entirely terrestrial and not entirely marine. This is not a true land snail, but it is also not a true sea snail. Unlike almost all other snails that have opercula, this species breathes air. It is common in New Zealand.

Description
The thick shell of this species is about 20 mm in size.

Ecology
Amphibola crenata is a curiosity, as it seems to represent a transitional state between marine and terrestrial gastropods. The mantle is employed as a lung, and therefore immersion of the animal in sea water is of secondary importance, and occurs for not more than an hour at each high tide.

This is one of very few air-breathing marine snails with an operculum and a veliger larva.

Food chain 
This snail is a detritus or deposit feeder. It extracts bacteria, diatoms and decomposing matter from the surface sand. It egests the sand and a slimy secretion that is a rich source of food for bacteria.

Human use
In the past this species was an important food for the Māori.

From Dave Robson, Auckland, NZ. - The titiko, karahue, pupu, Amphibola Crenata or mud-flat snail was plentiful in traditional times but because it took a lot of effort to extract the "meat" it was not a "staple" food of Maori. In earlier times it was preferable to travel miles by waka to collect pipi rather than walk 200m to scoop up the titko and spending a lot of effort to recover the meat. The titiko couldn't be used as a relish (kinaki) as it is a sealed unit with a hard shell and a cap (even 2) attached to its body that closes up and is difficult to remove. The only way in traditional times to remove the meat was to either smash the whole shell or to smash the top end and suck-out the soft contents.

25 years ago I was with a group of archaeologists near my papakainga (village) Maramarahi near Thames, NZ where they were explaining to me what a shell midden was. They said this is what your people were eating hundreds of years ago. I noticed that there were only a handful of Titiko in the midden even though there were tonnes readily available nearby. In comparison, there were hundreds of pipi and cockle shells. Over the next 25 years I asked every archaeologists and read heaps of archaeological reports/assessments as to why there were few Titiko in the midden. Their views is that it was a seasonal harvest, pollution had affected their habitats, not tasty, at least some acknowledged the difficulty to recover the meat.
 
In the late 1950s and early 1960s I recall waiting for the time of the spring tide (3am low tide) and either wander to the mud-flats to pick titiko or cycle to the coast to pick pipi's. We would sweep and gather the titiko up with a branch, put then in a flax kete, wash/shake them in the incoming tide and then into a pot at home, boiled, then out would come the safety pin and titiko on hot fried bread and butter - only a delightful memory.

It was only recently that I knew the full answer. It was the availability of the standard safety pin which were being used for tying up babies nappies. We only had one safety pin but it was an ideal tool – it had the perfect bend to access the Titiko cap/s and it had a sustained sharp point to pierce the cap/s and to pull out the tasty morsel including its tasty and chewy head and tastier entrails from the apex.

Unfortunately I haven't had a meal of Titiko since 1963 and over the last 25 years during my travels all over NZ I have not seen a mature Titiko. I usually ask the old people I meet in my travel about the Titiko and they tell me the same story – they are small ones (10mm) around but no mature sized ones (25mm) ideal for eating. Apparently the Titiko, karahue, pupu, amphibola crenata  is not a threatened species but unfortunately the mature ones certainly are.

References

 Rosenberg, G. 1992. Encyclopedia of Seashells. Dorset: New York. 224 pp. page(s): 125 
 Golding R.E., Ponder W.F. & Byrne M. 2007. Taxonomy and anatomy of Amphiboloidea (Gastropoda: Heterobranchia: Archaeopulmonata). Zootaxa 1476: 1-50
page(s): 7

External links 
 1966 Te Ara encyclopedia entry

Gastropods of New Zealand
Amphibolidae
Gastropods described in 1791
Taxa named by Johann Friedrich Gmelin